Melby is a farming village in the municipality of Skaun in Trøndelag county, Norway.

There is an old, preserved school building dating from 1878 in Melby. The school building is a part of the local museum Skaun bygdamuseum.  The area is named Melby (Old Norse: Meðalbýr), which means "middle farm".

References

Skaun
Villages in Trøndelag